Jules Duvaux (21 May 1827 – 2 June 1902) was a French politician of the French Third Republic. He was born in Nancy, France. He was a member of the Chamber of Deputies of France in 1876. He was minister of public instruction and fine arts (7 August 1882 – 21 February 1883) in the governments of Charles Duclerc and Armand Fallières. His predecessor and successor in this office was Jules Ferry.

Sources 
 

1827 births
1902 deaths
Politicians from Nancy, France
Republican Union (France) politicians
Government ministers of France
Members of the 1st Chamber of Deputies of the French Third Republic
Members of the 2nd Chamber of Deputies of the French Third Republic
Members of the 3rd Chamber of Deputies of the French Third Republic
Members of the 4th Chamber of Deputies of the French Third Republic